Waimakariri may refer to:
 Waimakariri River
 Waimakariri Gorge
 Waimakariri District
 Waimakariri (New Zealand electorate)